Dongargaon is one of the 90 Legislative Assembly constituencies of Chhattisgarh state in India. It is in Rajnandgaon district and is a segment of Rajnandgaon Lok Sabha seat. The seat used to be part of Madhya Pradesh Legislative Assembly when Chhattisgarh was part of MP.

Members of Assembly

Madhya Pradesh Assembly, until 2000
 : 
 1980 : Hiraram Verma (INC-I)
 1998 : Smt. Gita Devi Singh (INC)

Chhattisgarh Assembly, since 2000 
 2003 : Pradeep Gandhi (BJP)
 2004 bypoll : Raman Singh (BJP)

^: by-polls

Election results

1980 Assembly Election
 Hiraram Verma (INC-I) : 11,487 votes  
 Vidyabhushan Thakur (JNP-SR) : 8,833

1998 Assembly Election
 Smt. Gita Devi Singh (INC) : 25,125 votes  
 Ashok Sharma (BJP) : 24,247

2003 Assembly Election
 Pradeep Gandhi (BJP) : 42,784 votes  
 Geeta Devi Singh (INC) : 36,649

2004 Bypoll
 Dr. Raman Singh (BJP) : 42,115 votes  
 Geeta Devi Singh (INC) : 32,004

2018

See also
List of constituencies of the Chhattisgarh Legislative Assembly
Rajnandgaon district

References

Rajnandgaon district
Assembly constituencies of Chhattisgarh